Ciuciulea is a genus of cetotheriid mysticete found in middle Miocene marine deposits in Moldova.

Description
Ciuciulea is a dwarf cetotheriid 3–4 meters in length. It comes from the Badenian deposits (13.8-12.7 Ma) of the Central Paratethys, and this is the earliest world record of the family Cetotheriidae. It differs from the other Cetotheriidae in the presence of a narrow occipital shield, which is as long as wide, and a pars cochlearis of the periotic bone bulging out ventral to fenestra rotunda. Primitive characters include the premaxillae forming a transverse line with the posterior ends of nasals and maxillae rather than constricted or overridden by ascending processes of maxillae.

Biology
Ciuciulea lived in shallow marine waters in present-day Moldova, earlier than true seals Pontophoca, Sarmatonectes, Histriophoca, Monachopsis, Cryptophoca, and Praepusa, the putative kentriodontid Sarmatodelphis, and the problematic odontocetes Pachypleurus, Phocaena euxinica, and Delphinus bessarabicus.

References 

Baleen whales
Prehistoric cetacean genera
Miocene cetaceans
Miocene mammals of Europe
Fossil taxa described in 2018